Gemursa is a genus of parasitic flies in the family Tachinidae.

Species
Gemursa fuscipes Barraclough, 1992
Gemursa trimaculata Barraclough, 1992

References

Dexiinae
Diptera of Australasia
Tachinidae genera